Dutchess Mall was an enclosed shopping mall in Fishkill, New York. In 2006, the main portion of the mall was demolished and replaced with a Home Depot except for the Jamesway and Service Merchandise anchor store buildings. The former Service Merchandise building was home to a flea market until the mid-2000s but now sits vacant and empty. At some point in the mid-2000s, the Dutchess Marketplace Flea Market move to the former Jamesway building, although it closed at the end of 2019. A new campus for Dutchess Community College moved into the Jamesway space and opened in August 2021. That portion of the property is still owned by J.W. May's.

History
The Dutchess Mall opened during 1974 as the first mall in Dutchess County. 
The mall occupied a portion of a site used during the American Revolutionary War by the Fishkill Encampment and Supply Depot, which has been listed on the National Register of Historic Places since Dutchess Mall's opening. The Fishkill Encampment was previously scheduled for conversion to a national park, but the plan was rejected. Original anchors of the mall included Mays and Luckey Platt, two local department stores; other major tenants included Flah's (another local department store) and Drug World (a pharmacy), as well as Radio Shack and Waldenbooks.

Mays, which closed following their 1982 bankruptcy, was replaced with Gaynes. Gaynes, in turn, was converted to a Jamesway discount shop during 1988, which closed following their liquidation in 1995. Luckey Platt closed in the 1980s and was replaced with Service Merchandise, which closed on December 24, 1996.  The former Service Merchandise was soon replaced with the Dutchess Flea Market.  With both anchor stores gone, the other shops began ending operations as well, and by 2001 only the flea market remained.

Although the only enclosed shopping mall in Fishkill, the Dutchess Mall was often unable to attract many well-known tenants, due to persistent rumors of a larger mall being built nearby. The rumored mall, which would have been anchored by Macy's, was never built. Because it could not attract stores easily, and because the anchor stores had changed, the Dutchess Mall was quick to lose tenants, eventually replacing a large portion of its retail space with a satellite campus of Marist College. Other problems of the mall included an outdated mall design; competition from the nearby Poughkeepsie Galleria and South Hills Mall; and the beginning of big box type retail.

Post-mall revitalization
In 1999, plans were announced to convert the mall into a business community named Hudson Valley Metro Centre. The project would have included office tenants, a recreational facility, child care, and restaurants. Due to high startup costs, the plan was abandoned, and by 2001, the mall was sealed off entirely except for the flea market, which remained open. Two years later, a group of designers from New York devised a plan to convert Dutchess Mall into a women's prison. This plan was one of the finalists in "Dead Malls", a competition created by the Los Angeles Forum for Architecture and Urban Design. This plan, however, was not realized.

Finally, after several years of vacancy, the mall was demolished for a Home Depot, which opened on July 5, 2006. Only the mall building itself was demolished, however, and the former Jamesway and Service Merchandise buildings were left intact. 

Besides the Home Depot, there is also a McDonald's and a Citizen's Bank branch occupying space toward the front of the property. In 2007, the Dutchess Mall was the subject of a documentary named Fish Kill Flea; the documentary's emphasis was the mall's flea market. By 2014, the old Jamesway had become the new home of Dutchess Marketplace, a flea market with a variety of vendors. Behind the property is a nine hole golf course. By the end of 2019, the Dutchess Marketplace closed. In August 2019, Dutchess Community College announced plans to open a campus at the site of the former mall, in the former Jamesway building. This new campus of Dutchess Community College replaced the Hollowbrook campus located in Wappingers Falls. The campus was slated to open in Fall 2020, but due to the COVID-19 pandemic, the opening was pushed back until August 2021. A ribbon cutting ceremony to mark the opening of the new campus was held on June 10, 2021.

References 

 

Shopping malls in New York (state)
Demolished shopping malls in the United States
U.S. Route 9
Shopping malls established in 1974
Fishkill, New York